Douglas Smith (born 1884, date of death unknown) was a Guyanese cricketer. He played in two first-class matches for British Guiana in 1912/13.

See also
 List of Guyanese representative cricketers

References

External links
 

1884 births
Year of death missing
Guyanese cricketers
Guyana cricketers
Place of birth missing